

Expeditions, field work, and fossil discoveries

Institutions and organizations

Natural history museums

Scientific organizations

Scientific advances

Paleoanthropology

Paleobotany

Evolutionary biology

Exopaleontology

Extinction research

Micropaleontology

Invertebrate paleozoology

Trace fossils

Vertebrate paleozoology

Data courtesy of George Olshevsky's dinosaur genera list.

Research techniques

Fossil trade

Law and politics

Regulation of fossil collection, transport, or sale

Fossil-related crime

Official symbols

Protected areas

Ethics and practice

Hoaxes

Scandals

Unethical practice

People

Births

Awards and recognition

Deaths

Historiography and anthropology of paleontology

Pseudoscience

Popular culture

Amusement parks and attractions

Art

Comics

Film

Gaming

Literature

Philately

Television

See also

References

1910s in paleontology
Paleontology
Paleontology 8